Karoly Szanyo (born 10 November 1973) is a Hungarian reformer professional football player and manager. He was a member of the Hungary squad that reached the 1996 Summer Olympics finals in Atlanta, United States.

References

1973 births
Living people
Hungarian footballers
Footballers from Budapest
Association football forwards
Hungary under-21 international footballers
Nemzeti Bajnokság I players
2. Bundesliga players
Austrian Football Bundesliga players
Újpest FC players
VfB Lübeck players
SV Ried players
Debreceni VSC players
Ironi Kiryat Ata players
Győri ETO FC players
Vasas SC players
Hungarian expatriate footballers
Hungarian expatriate sportspeople in Germany
Expatriate footballers in Germany
Hungarian expatriate sportspeople in Austria
Expatriate footballers in Austria
Hungarian expatriate sportspeople in Israel
Expatriate footballers in Israel
Hungarian football managers
Nemzeti Bajnokság I managers